Glazebury and Bury Lane is a closed railway station between Liverpool and Manchester.

The station opened on 15 September 1830 by the Liverpool and Manchester Railway as Bury Lane, being renamed Glazebury and Bury Lane in 1878. The station closed on 7 July 1958.

References

Sources

External links
 The station's history Disused Stations UK
 The station and line on overlain maps Rail Maps Online
 The station on an 1849 OS map National Library of Scotland
 The station on overlain old OS maps National Library of Scotland
 The station on a 1948 OS Map npe maps
 The line and mileages railwaycodes

Disused railway stations in Warrington
Former London and North Western Railway stations
Railway stations in Great Britain opened in 1830
Railway stations in Great Britain closed in 1958
1830 establishments in England